Trichotria is a genus of rotifers belonging to the family Trichotriidae.

The genus has almost cosmopolitan distribution.

Species:
 Trichotria brevidactyla Harring, 1913 
 Trichotria buchneri Koste, Shiel & Tan, 1988

References

Ploima